The hydration number, or solvation number of a compound is defined as the average number of molecules bound to the compound more strongly (by 13.3 kcal/mol or more) than they are bound to other water molecules. The hydration number is dependent on the concentration of the compound in solution, and the identity of the compound. When compounds are dissolved in water, the water molecules form a solvation shell surrounding the solute. For charged species, the orientation of water molecules around the solute is dependent on its ionic charge, with cations attracting water’s electronegative oxygen and anions attracting the hydrogens. Uncharged compounds such as methane can also be solvated by water and also have a hydration number. Although solvation shells can contain inner and outer shell solvent-solute interactions, the hydration number generally focuses on the inner shell solvent molecules that most directly interact with the solute.

Background
Given the overwhelming abundance of liquid water found in biological systems and the high prevalence of dissolved ionic species, understanding the behavior of ions in solution is critical. Ions in solution must overcome not only the preferred entropic state of disordered water molecules in order to form a solvation shell, but also the powerful hydrogen bonding interactions found between water molecules. Attraction between the solute ion and water increases with the solute’s electric charge and decreases with its radius. Hydration number estimates are not limited to integer values (for instance, estimates for sodium include 4, 4.6, 5.3, 5.5, 5.6, 6, 6.5, and 8), with some of the spread of estimated values being due to differing detection methods.

Determination of hydration number
Hydration numbers can be determined using a variety of different experimental methods. These include Raman spectroscopy, neutron and X-ray scattering, luminescence, and NMR. Hydration numbers can change depending on whether the species is locked into a crystalline lattice form or free flowing in solution. The apparent hydration number of a species can vary depending on which experimental method was used. Large alkali metal cations in particular, very common throughout nature and in biological systems, remain unreliably characterized.

Using NMR methods 
Although NMR is the most informative technique for determining hydration numbers, it does suffer from severe limitations on its usefulness. 1H NMR signals may be obtained trivially for ions such as  Ni2+, Co2+, and most lanthanide(III) cations surrounded by water but some ions such as Cu2+, Mn2+, and Gd3+ cause great line-broadening. Another limitation of NMR for determining hydration number arises from the time scale of approximately 1x10-4 s which a nucleus must remain in, in order to be detected as a distinct entity. Molecular diffusion occurs on much faster timescales for a large number of solvents and solvent molecules in most ionic solutions may move between environments many times within 1x10-4 s. However metal ions exist which are so tightly bound to the solvent molecules surrounding them, that the time they reside in one place is greater than 1x10-4 s. In these cases one observes two peaks for the solvent (as oppose to one when the timescale is shorter), one for the solvent coordinated with the ion in the primary solvation shell and the other for general solvent, these are conventionally labelled as "coordinated" and "bulk" respectively. Note the bulk peak will also include signal arising from water molecules in the secondary solvation shell of both the cation and anion as well as the primary solvation shell of the anion. Using these peaks the solvation number of the cation may be trivially determined from the NMR spectrum. Ion pairing where the anion enters the solvation shell of the cation may cause this method to fail and early, incorrect estimates of 5 for the solvation number of Zn2+ may have arose because of this issue. In the past greater concentrations were required to record NMR spectra but even today, concentrations may still be too high to assume "ideal" behavior for determining hydration numbers. Cooling may also be employed to reduce the rate of exchange of molecules in the solvation shell allow the coordinated and bulk peaks to be obtained.

Using Ion movement methods 
Ion movement methods involve assessing the resistance to motion hence estimating an effective volume for a solvated ion and from that volume the solvation number. The motion may be from diffusion, mechanically engineered by changes to viscosity or caused by electrical means. Many of these methods give the sum of anion and cation contributions but some can work out values for independent ions. For monoatomic ions, decreasing ionic radius shows decreasing conductivity suggesting that the effective radius of the hydrated ion increases as ionic radius decreases (larger ions are less mobile so their ability to move charge is decreased). Once the mobility of the ions is determined it is possible to estimate diffusion coefficients and from those hydrodynamic radii. The hydrodynamic radii may be used to calculate the number of solvent molecules.

Methane clathrates

Methane is the simplest hydrocarbon compound. Although it is relatively hydrophobic, its small size allows it to be solvated in a crystalline shell of water at low temperatures and high pressures. This forms a solid crystalline compound similar to ice that can be found in great quantities under the sediments of the planet’s ocean floors. The hydration number for methane in a clathrate is 46 water molecules per unit cell. Methane in solution has a hydration number of 20. In addition to methane, other simple molecules like ethane and carbon dioxide can also form hydrates in these extreme environments. 

Given the dependence on cold temperatures in keeping the hydrated methane locked away from the atmosphere, anthropogenic climate change has emerged as a possible destabilizing force to the vast reserves of clathrates. Estimates of the amount of methane locked into clathrates range from 500–2500 gigatons of carbon. Due to the flammability of methane gas, methane clathrates can burn creating a striking “burning ice”. The abundance of methane clathrates also make it a tempting future source of fossil fuel energy.

References

Solutions
Chemical properties
Chemical bonding